Curtis William Gentry (August 8, 1937 – October 29, 2022) was an American football player and coach.  He played professionally as a defensive back for three seasons  in the National Football League (NFL) with the Chicago Bears.  Gentry served as the head football coach at Alabama Agricultural and Mechanical University in 1976 and at Lincoln University in Jefferson City, Missouri in 1980.

Gentry died in Durham, North Carolina, on October 29, 2022, at the age of 85.

Head coaching record

References

1937 births
2022 deaths
American football defensive backs
Alabama A&M Bulldogs football coaches
Chicago Bears players
Holy Cross Crusaders football coaches
Lincoln Blue Tigers football coaches
Maryland Eastern Shore Hawks football players
North Carolina A&T Aggies football coaches
Northwestern Wildcats football coaches
Paul Quinn Tigers football coaches
Sportspeople from Kentucky
Coaches of American football from Kentucky
Players of American football from Kentucky
African-American coaches of American football
African-American players of American football
20th-century African-American sportspeople
21st-century African-American sportspeople